The 2023 ISSF World Cup is the annual edition of the ISSF World Cup in the Olympic shooting events, governed by the International Shooting Sport Federation.

Calendar
The calendar for the 2023 ISSF World Cup include 12 stages.

Venues

Participation

Rifle events

Men's individual

Men's team

Women's individual

Women's team

Mixed team

Medal table

Pistol events

Men's individual

Men's team

Women's individual

Women's team

Mixed team

Medal table

Shotgun events

Men's individual

Men's team

Women's individual

Women's Team

Mixed Team

Medal table

Overall Medal table

World Cup

Doha (Shotgun)

References 

ISSF World Cup